The Cultural and Educational Panel is one of five vocational panels which together elect 43 of the 60 members of Seanad Éireann, the upper house of the Oireachtas (the legislature of Ireland). The Cultural and Educational Panel elects five senators.

Election
Article 18 of the Constitution of Ireland provides that 43 of the 60 senators are to be elected from five vocational panels. The Cultural and Educational Panel is defined in Article 18.7.1º (i) as "National Language and Culture, Literature, Art, Education and such professional interests as may be defined by law for the purpose of this panel". The Seanad returning officer maintains a list of nominating bodies for each of the five panels. Candidates may be nominated either by four members of the Oireachtas or by a nominating body. The electorate consists of city and county councillors and current members of the Oireachtas. As the Seanad election takes place after the election to the Dáil, the Oireachtas members are the members of the incoming Dáil and the outgoing Seanad. Five senators are elected on the Cultural and Educational Panel, at least two of whom must have been nominated by Oireachtas members and at least two must have been nominated by nominating bodies.

Senators

Notes

List of nominating bodies
The following bodies are on the register of nominating bodies maintained by the Seanad Returning Officer for the Cultural and Educational Panel:
Association of Secondary Teachers, Ireland (ASTI)
Comhaltas Ceoltóirí Éireann
Comhlámh
Conradh na Gaeilge
Bar Council of Ireland
Dental Council of Ireland
Drama League of Ireland
Education and Training Boards Ireland
Gael Linn
Gaeloideachas
Genealogical Society of Ireland
Institute of Community Health Nursing
Institute of Guidance Counsellors
Irish Countrywomen's Association
Irish Dental Association
Irish Federation of University Teachers
Irish Georgian Society
Irish National Teachers' Organisation
Law Society of Ireland
Library Association of Ireland
Local Authority Medical Specialists
National Youth Council of Ireland
Old Dublin Society
Royal College of Physicians of Ireland
Royal College of Surgeons in Ireland
Royal Irish Academy
Royal Irish Academy of Music
Royal Society of Antiquaries of Ireland
Teachers' Union of Ireland
Theatre Forum
Údarás na Gaeltachta
Veterinary Council
Visual Artists Ireland
Writers' Guild of Ireland

References

Seanad constituencies